The Magister Trilogy is a fantasy trilogy written by Celia S. Friedman.  It includes:
Feast of Souls (2007)
Wings of Wrath (February 3, 2009)
Legacy of Kings (August 23, 2011).

External links
https://web.archive.org/web/20040124201455/http://www.merentha.org/ C.S. Friedman's official fan site
http://www.csfriedman.com/ C.S. Friedman's personal site

Fantasy novel trilogies